Juan de Dios Castro Lozano (25 March 1942 – 24 November 2020) was a Mexican lawyer and politician affiliated with the National Action Party.

Biography
As of 2014 he served as Deputy of the LI, LII, LV and LIX Legislatures of the Mexican Congress as a plurinominal representative and as Senator of the LVI and LVII Legislatures.

He also was President of the Chamber of Deputies from 2003 to 2004.

Castro Lozano died on 24 November 2020, at age 78, from COVID-19 in Lerdo, Durango.

References

1942 births
2020 deaths
Politicians from Torreón
20th-century Mexican lawyers
Members of the Senate of the Republic (Mexico)
Members of the Chamber of Deputies (Mexico)
Presidents of the Chamber of Deputies (Mexico)
National Action Party (Mexico) politicians
Deaths from the COVID-19 pandemic in Mexico
Autonomous University of Coahuila alumni
20th-century Mexican politicians
21st-century Mexican politicians